M-69 is an east–west state trunkline highway in the Upper Peninsula (UP) of the U.S. state of Michigan. It connects with US Highway 2 (US 2) on both ends in Crystal Falls and near Bark River.

Before the creation of the U.S. Highway System, the current M-69 was a portion of M-12. The original M-69 was replaced by  US 102 and the M-69 designation was reused on a section of M-12 not replaced by US 2. Further changes to the current highway truncated it for three decades. The eastern section removed from M-69 was given the County-Designated Highway designation G-30 until the change was reversed. In 2002, the historic Paint River Bridge in Crystal Falls was rehabilitated, repairing it and restoring it to the original appearance.

Route description

M-69 starts at the intersection of 5th Street and Superior Avenue in Crystal Falls, where it meets US 2/US 141. The Iron County Courthouse is located at the head of Superior Avenue and overlooks a steep hill headed east through downtown. The City of Crystal Falls states that the courthouse offers "a view of the main street of the City and the scenic panorama of the valley at its feet". On a clear day, Iron Mountain can be seen from the courthouse tower. It is from this starting point that M-69 descends Superior Avenue through downtown toward the Paint River in Iron County. The highway crosses the river on a historic bridge built in 1929 that features decorative lamp posts and railings. The bridge was rehabilitated for five months in 2002. This rehabilitation involved replacing the bridge deck, repairing the bridge's substructure, and restoring the lighting and railings to original designs. Because this bridge is listed on Michigan's list of historic bridges, the construction work had to preserve the original historic character of the bridge. Final construction was completed at a cost of $1,130,545 (equivalent to $ in ). A complete bridge replacement would have cost 25% more without saving the historic bridge.

On the opposite bank of the river, Superior Avenue climbs a hill past the Evergreen Cemetery at the top. The section of roadway up to this point carries the highest levels of traffic as measured by the Michigan Department of Transportation (MDOT) in their annual average daily traffic (AADT) surveys. Some 3,900 vehicles used this segment of trunkline daily in 2007. Outside of town, the trunkline runs south of Runkle Lake through hilly, wooded terrain. The roadway crosses the southern section of the Michigamme River west of the Dickinson County line.

The post office in Sagola was established in 1889 to serve the timber-harvesting community. M-69 turns south along M-95, and together the two highways run south for about  concurrently to the unincorporated community of Randville. This segment of the trunkline had the highest commercial traffic in the state's AADT surveys. Some 560 trucks used this roadway daily in 2007, according to MDOT. This second unincorporated community was settled for iron mining at the adjacent Groveland Mine at the turn of the century. M-69 and M-95 separate in Randville as the former turns east and the latter continues southward.

Between Randville and the former community of Metropolitan, M-69 runs along the West Branch of the Sturgeon River through more hilly terrain. The trunkline continues east to the twin communities of Theodore and Felch. The river and the road part ways until meeting again at Foster City. This is also the location of a unique junction of highways. M-69 meets G-69, a County-Designated Highway that runs south to Loretto in southern Dickinson County. The intersection in unique because some states, such as California, do not allow two highways to share a common number.

The highway continues to follow the river until crossing it at Hardwood before curving southeasterly and crossing into northern Menominee County. The highway crosses the northern end of the county through relatively flat terrain. The lowest AADT counts were measured here in 2007 at 550 vehicles. Near the unincorporated community of Perronville, the roadway runs through hills near a crossing of the Ten Mile Creek west of the county line. Continuing to the southeast, M-69 meets the community of Schaffer at the Delta County line. This line marks the transition from the Central Time Zone to the Eastern Time Zone. In Delta County, M-69 turns south along the Bark River and crosses its north branch. Just after running about  into the county, M-69 crosses a set of railroad tracks from the Canadian National Railway's Wisconsin Central. There it meets US 2/US 41 east of the community of Bark River, home to the Hannahville Indian Community. This marks the western end of the highway, halfway between Bark River and Hyde, west of Escanaba.

History

In 1919, M-69 started at the state line south of Crystal Falls. It ran north through Crystal Falls, where it intersected M-12, to end in Covington at an intersection with M-28. This roadway was redesignated with the creation of the U.S. Highway System in 1926. US 2 replaced M-69 south and M-12 west of Crystal Falls. US 102 replaced M-69 north of Crystal Falls, and the latter designation was reused on the section of M-12 east of town. Where the roadway intersected M-45 (now M-95) in Sagola, M-69 joined it to Randville and then replaced M-90 east to Foster City by 1927. By 1930, the highway was extended through Menominee County into Delta County to end at an intersection with US 2/US 41 east of Bark River. This extension gave M-69 its current routing.

Maps published later that year do not indicate any change in jurisdiction to the highway.

In 1960, the section of M-69 east of Randville was decommissioned, and the concurrency with M-95 was removed. The transfer to county control was part of a program to reduce the total state highway mileage in the state. After October 5, 1970, this section was renamed G-30 with the beginning of the County-Designated Highway program in Michigan.

At various points, the road commissions in Dickinson, Menominee and Delta counties tried to give the roadway back to the state for maintenance. Menominee County made the request in 1974 and 1982, both times rejected because the road did not carry enough traffic to be a state highway. The road was a maintenance issue for the counties because of its relative isolation and high truck traffic carrying pulpwood to the paper mill in Escanaba and potatoes from farms near Felch. The roadway was in a relative state of disrepair in 1982, and the counties wanted the state to fix it. Menominee County estimated that it would cost $500,000 (equivalent to $ in ) for their  stretch, while Dickinson estimated that it would cost $1 million (equivalent to $ in ) for their .

This county road designation lasted until 1993. That year, the changes made in 1960 were reversed and M-69 was re-extended along M-95 and back to the Bark River area.

Major intersections

See also

References

External links

M-69 at Michigan Highways

069
Transportation in Iron County, Michigan
Transportation in Dickinson County, Michigan
Transportation in Menominee County, Michigan
Transportation in Delta County, Michigan